Miss Thailand Universe 2004 was the 5th Miss Thailand Universe pageant, held at Sofitel Centara Grand Bangkok, in Bangkok, Thailand on March 27, 2004. The 44 contestants arrived in Chiang Mai to participate in activities a week earlier, then returned to Bangkok to compete in the final round, which was broadcast live on BBTV Channel 7.  Chananporn Rosjan was crowned Miss Thailand Universe 2004 by Yaowalak Traisurat, Miss Thailand Universe 2003.

Morakot Aimee Kittisara represented Thailand in Miss Universe 2004 pageant in Quito, Ecuador.

Results
Color keys

The winner and two runner-up were awarded to participate internationally (two title from the Big Four international beauty pageants and one minor international beauty pageants) positions were given in the following order:

Placements

Special awards

Delegates

References

External links 
 

2004
2004 in Bangkok
2004 beauty pageants
March 2004 events in Thailand
Beauty pageants in Thailand